Ringwood may refer to:

Places

Australia
Ringwood, New South Wales, in Federation Council area
 Ringwood, Queensland
Ringwood, Victoria, a suburb of Melbourne
Ringwood railway station, Melbourne

Canada
Ringwood, Ontario, a hamlet in the town of Whitchurch-Stouffville

England
Ringwood, Hampshire
Ringwood railway station

United States
Ringwood, Illinois
Ringwood, New Jersey
Ringwood, Oklahoma

People
Bob Ringwood (born 1946), British costume designer 
Gwen Pharis Ringwood (1910-1984), Canadian playwright
Michael T. Ringwood (born 1958), American leader of the LDS church
Philip Ringwood (born 1953), English cricketer
Ted Ringwood (1930-1993), Australian geologist

Other
Ringwood, the common name of Syzygium anisatum, an Australian rainforest tree